Glenmore is an unincorporated community located in northern Warren County, Kentucky, United States. Glenmore is part of the Bowling Green Metropolitan Statistical Area.

Geography 
Glenmore is located in extreme-northern Warren County along the Green River. The community is nestled near the tripoint where Warren County’s northern boundaries meet with those of Butler and Edmonson Counties.

Transportation
Currently, two state-maintained routes, Kentucky Routes 1749 (KY 1749) and 185 (KY 185) directly serve the area. KY 185 connects the area to Bowling Green to the south and the cities of Roundhill and Caneyville to the north. KY 1749 mainly serves rural areas of northern Warren and southern Edmonson Counties, including Wingfield.

Historically, Glenmore also had a direct connection to west-central areas of Edmonson County when the original Kentucky Route 67 ran its course from Bowling Green to Asphalt and Windyville. The Bear Creek Ferry, also previously known as Honaker’s Ferry, was a toll ferry that operated from the 1920s until the late 1960s as a direct connection from Bowling Green to Edmonson County’s northern and west-central communities.

Education 
Most students in Glenmore attend Warren County Public Schools, including Warren Central High School. Richardsville Elementary is the closest elementary school to the community.

Points of interest in and around Glenmore 
Mouth of Bear Creek Boat Landing 
Shanty Hollow Lake - man-made lake just south of Glenmore
U.S. Army Corps of Engineers Green River Lock and Dam Number 5 (operated 1901-1950)

Nearby cities and communities 
Brownsville
Bowling Green
Morgantown
Reedyville
Richardsville 
Roundhill

References 

Glenmore
Glenmore